This is a list of Dutch television related events from 1981.

Events
11 March - Linda Williams is selected to represent Netherlands at the 1981 Eurovision Song Contest with her song "Het is een wonder". She is selected to be the twenty-sixth Dutch Eurovision entry during Nationaal Songfestival held at Zuidplein Theatre in Rotterdam.

Debuts
5 January - Jeugdjournaal (1981–present)

Television shows

1950s
NOS Journaal (1956–present)

1970s
Sesamstraat (1976–present)

Ending this year

Births

Deaths